Port au Port may refer to:
Port au Port Peninsula, a peninsula on the island of Newfoundland
Port au Port, Newfoundland and Labrador, a community on the peninsula